Civil Liberties Protection Officer is the title of a position under the U.S. Office of the Director of National Intelligence, created on December 7, 2005, with the appointment of Alex Joel by Director John Negroponte.

Authority and duties
The Director of National Security appoints the Civil Liberties Protection Officer, in accordance with 50 USC 403-3d, and is not an appointment confirmed by the United States Congress. The primary responsibility of the officer is to lead the ODNI's Civil Liberties and Privacy Office. The Civil Liberties Protection Officer reports directly to the Director of National Intelligence.

The position is not an Inspector General as defined in the IG Act of 1978, so this official does not have the power to compel intelligence agencies to disclose information or the obligation to report to Congress.

See also
Alex Joel

External links
Office of the Director of National Intelligence Mini-Biography
Wall Street Journal article

United States Directors of National Intelligence
2005 establishments in the United States